Piotr Grabarczyk (born 31 October 1982) is a  former Polish handball player who played for the Polish national team.

Career

On 1 February 2015, Poland, including Grabarczyk, won the bronze medal of the 2015 World Championship. He also participated at the 2016 European Men's Handball Championship.

State awards
 2015  Silver Cross of Merit

References

External links
Profile

1982 births
Living people
Sportspeople from Olsztyn
Polish male handball players
Vive Kielce players
Expatriate handball players
Polish expatriate sportspeople in Germany
Handball-Bundesliga players
21st-century Polish people